Le Quy Don High School for the Gifted (Vietnamese: Trường Trung học phổ thông chuyên Lê Quý Đôn) is a designated high school for the gifted in Vung Tau, Vietnam. It was established on 19 August 1991. The school is specialized for gifted students who possess interest and talent in the Natural Sciences, Social Sciences, or Foreign Language.

History 
In December 1988, the Department of Education and Training of Ba Ria-Vung Tau Province initiated a project for middle school for the gifted in two majors: Literature and Mathematics. For the school year 1990-1991, Chairman of the People's Committee of Vung Tau-Con Dao Special Administrative Region decided to establish Le Quy Don High School for the Gifted, with the campus located at 58 Tran Hung Dao Street, Ward 1, Vung Tau city.

In July 2009, the People's Committee of Ba Ria-Vung Tau Province initiated a plan to relocate the school's campus from a small area on Tran Hung Dao street to a much larger area of 9 hectares on 3/2 Street, Ward 11. After two years of construction, the new campus officially came to effect in November 2011, with better equipped infrastructure and learning environment. In August 2016, in commemoration of the school's 25-year span of history, Le Quy Don High School for the Gifted was awarded the Second Labor Order from the Vietnamese government for having garnered numerous achievements in education.

Infrastructure 
Originally located at a small campus on Tran Hung Dao Street in Ward 1 of Vung Tau city, the school was relocated to a much larger campus (9 hectares) at 3/2 Street in Ward 11 in 2010. The city government funded the school to make it a "high-quality school" with total funding of 300 billion VND (approximately $14.2 million).

In addition to studying, the school also provides area for recreational and athletic activities including three outdoor basketball courts, a multi-purpose sport center, an artificial lake, a theatre for performing arts activities, a park and a 30-metre hill.

Education 
Le Quy Don High School for the Gifted offers each grade (10th, 11th, and 12th) 12 classes for majors, each specializing in a single subject including: Mathematics (3 classes), Physics (1 class), Information technology (1 class), Chemistry (2 classes), Biology (1 class), Vietnamese Literature (1 class), and English (3 classes). Class size ranges from 25 to 30 students. Selected students are sorted into classes from 1 to 2 or 3. For example, students in class Math 1 are those who have higher academic scores and are evaluated as being more excellent than students in class Math 2 and 3 (The only exception is school year 2011-2012 when students were selected randomly into class 1 and 2)

Tuition fee is at the same level with public schools in Vietnam (60,000 VND/month, approximately US$23.76/year). Apart from the statutory fee, each student has to pay an extra amount of approximately 500,000 VND (US$22) per month for the duration of a school year if they wish to apply for the school's special enhancing program for Vietnamese university entrance examination.

Admission 
Students who want to be admitted must take an advanced written examination consisting of four tests: Mathematics, Literature, English, and one self-selected subject (this subject is one of the major subjects for 12 classes, and the test for the subject is designed by the school committee with complicated questions both in research and practice fields to classify students into different classes based on their performances). Approximately 350 students achieving the highest scores in the examination will be chosen from the competitive pool of thousands of candidates.

References

External links 

High schools in Vietnam
High schools for the gifted in Vietnam